Frederick Hill was a politician in Florida during the Reconstruction era. He was a delegate to the 1868 Florida Constitutional Convention and represented Gadsden County in the Florida Legislature. He also served as a Gadsen County Commissioner and was the postmaster in Quincy, Florida for several years.

He served in the Florida House of Representatives representing Gadsden County from 1868 until 1870 and then in the Florida State Senate from 1871 until 1872. 

In 1874, he was accused of being on the receiving end of a bribery scheme related to the impeachment of Harrison Reed.

William.Saunders, also African American, was another representative for Gadsden County during Reconstruction.

See also
List of African-American officeholders during the Reconstruction era

References

Members of the Florida House of Representatives
19th-century American politicians
African-American politicians during the Reconstruction Era
African-American state legislators in Florida
Gadsden County, Florida
People from Quincy, Florida
Year of birth missing
Year of death missing